Ramble House is a small American publisher founded by Fender Tucker and Jim Weiler in 1999. The press specializes in reprints of long-neglected and rare crime fiction novels, modern crime fiction, 'weird menace' / 'shudder pulps' - short story collections from rare pulp magazines, scholarly works by noted authors on the crime fiction genre, and a host of other diverse books of a collectible or curious nature. Apart from its main publishing arm, Ramble House has two imprints: Surinam Turtle Press and Dancing Tuatara Press, headed by author Richard A. Lupoff and John Pelan respectively.

Ramble House titles were originally handmade by Tucker in small-crafted editions, but the growth in the publisher’s list together with print on demand technology led to the titles being available online now as trade paperback editions. Gavin L. O’Keefe is the cover designer for Ramble House books, creating many original new designs for the books or adapting existing art.

Harry Stephen Keeler and further crime fiction
The publisher began with the mission of bringing every novel written by Harry Stephen Keeler into print; these were mostly reprinted, though a number were rescued from unpublished typescripts and published for the first time. The press went on to publish new works of scholarship devoted to Harry Stephen Keeler and Edward D. Wood, Jr., as well as titles focusing on the crime fiction genre authored by Anthony Boucher, Francis M. Nevins, and Jon L. Breen. Other titles have concerned true crime (Bill Johnson’s Satan’s Den Exposed and a collection of contemporary newspaper accounts of the Jack the Ripper murders) and American historical figures (The Amorous Intrigues & Adventures of Aaron Burr and Diary and Journal of John Surratt, Conspirator).

Other authors
Other authors published by Ramble House include:

External links
Ramble House website

Book publishing companies of the United States
Publishing companies established in 1999
American companies established in 1999